This list is of prehistoric birds and avialan dinosaurs known from the fossil record of the Japanese archipelago. For extant birds from the area, see List of birds of Japan.

Mesozoic
{| class="wikitable sortable"  style="width:100%;"
|-
!width="10%" rowspan="2"|Clade
!width="10%" rowspan="2"|Clade
!width="10%" rowspan="2"|Family
!width="10%" rowspan="2"|Genus
!width="17%" rowspan="2"|Species
!width="17%" rowspan="2"|Synonyms
!width="10%" rowspan="2" class="unsortable"|Image
!width="16%" rowspan="2"|Age
|-
| rowspan="2"|Avialae || || || †Fukuipteryx || †F. primaeImai et al., 2019 || ||  || 
|-
| Hesperornithes || || †Chupkaornis || †C. keraorumTanaka et al., 2017 || || || 
|-
|}

Ootaxa
 Plagioolithus fukuiensis''

Cenozoic

See also

 List of prehistoric mammals of Japan
 Spectacled cormorant

References

Birds of Japan
Fossils of Japan